Derrick Charles Smith OD (born 27 November 1943) is a retired Jamaican politician from the Jamaica Labour Party. He was MP for Saint Andrew North Western from 2007 to 2018, and MP for Kingston West Central between 1983 and 1989.

References 

Living people
1943 births
Recipients of the Order of Distinction

Members of the 11th Parliament of Jamaica
Members of the 12th Parliament of Jamaica
Members of the 13th Parliament of Jamaica
Jamaica Labour Party politicians
20th-century Jamaican politicians
21st-century Jamaican politicians